Peter Tsou is a principal science staff member at the Jet Propulsion Laboratory (JPL) of the California Institute of Technology, where he has worked for the past 34 years. Dr. Tsou's research is focused on using aerogel for space exploration.

Tsou was the principal investigator (PI) for a number of Space Shuttle and Mir missions and was responsible for inventing the technique of intact capture of hypervelocity particles. He is known for his work involving the capture and return of cometary particles via NASA's Stardust mission as deputy PI.

Education
Tsou earned B.S. (1965) and M.S. (1966) in Electrical Engineering at the University of California, Berkeley. He received his Ph.D. Large Scale Engineering Systems from the University of California, Los Angeles, in 1972.

Career

Since 1974, Dr. Tsou has worked at NASA's Jet Propulsion Laboratory, located in Pasadena, CA. He is currently the Deputy Principal Investigator (PI) of STARDUST (1994–present). Dr. Tsou was a Principal Investigator for the MIR Sample Return Experiment (1994–1997), Spacehab II Sample Return Experiment, and Get Away Special Sample Return Experiment (1989–Present). He also was the STARDUST proposal manager (1992–1994), instrument definition manager (1984–1990), spacecraft system engineer (1982-1990), task manager for the Low-Cost Solar Array program (1975–1980), and a system engineer (1974–1975).

Prior to his work at JPL, Dr. Tsou worked at The University of California, Los Angeles, as a project manager on the Climate Impact Assessment Program of the Supersonic Transport (1970–1974), and at TRW as a technical staff member (1966–1968).

Research
His research interests for the past two decades has concentrated on achieving a return of cometary sample . He invented the technique of intact capture of hypervelocity particles for missions such as Stardust. Along with scientists at Lawrence Livermore National Laboratory, he helped create a lighter aerogel that was better suited for catching cometary particles. He helped introduce the use of aerogel as capture media and as a flight-qualified variable density material for space flight.

Dr. Tsou was responsible for inventing an integrated aerogel thermal-structural design for the Mars Pathfinder Sojourner rover, a discovery for space thermal insulation.

His other research interests include the exobiological effects of bodies from other planets and ways to get samples of materials from other planets.

Publications
Dr. Tsou has authored and co-authored more than 60 technical papers. Some selected publications:

Tsou, P., F. Giovane, J-C. Liou, R. Corsaro. "Large Area Dust Collection – on the International Space Station", 2007.
Tsou, P., D. E. Brownlee, R. Glesias, C. P. Grigoropoulos, M. Weschler, "Cutting Silica Aerogel for Particle Extraction", 36th LPSC, 2307, 2005.
Tsou, P., "Cosmic Dust Intact Capture Experiment", STAIF-99, 1999.
Tsou, P., "Hypervelocity Capture of Meteoroids in Aerogel", ASPCS Vol 104, 237–242, 1996.
Tsou, P., Albee A. L., "Comet Flyby Sample Return", AIAA-85-0465, 1985.

Awards
 2000 NASA Patent: Large Field of View 3-D Hologram Display System
 2000 NASA Group Achievement Award – STARDUST Project Team
 1997 NASA Exceptional Achievement Medal
 1996 JPL Inaugural Award for Excellence – Exceptional Technical Excellence
 1985 NASA Group Achievement Award – Low-Cost Solar Array Project

References

Living people
American scientists
NASA people
UC Berkeley College of Engineering alumni
University of California, Los Angeles alumni
University of California, Los Angeles staff
Year of birth missing (living people)